Jesse Freitas (February 7, 1921May 18, 2020) was an American professional football player who was a quarterback in the All-America Football Conference (AAFC). He played for the San Francisco 49ers, Chicago Rockets and Buffalo Bills His son, Jesse Jr., was also a quarterback in the National Football League.

After his playing career ended, Freitas became a football coach at Junípero Serra High School in San Mateo, California. On May 18, 2020, he died of cancer at age 99 in San Diego.

References

1921 births
2020 deaths
People from Red Bluff, California
Players of American football from California
American football quarterbacks
Santa Clara Broncos football players
Buffalo Bills (AAFC) players
Chicago Rockets players
San Francisco 49ers (AAFC) players
Deaths from cancer in California
San Francisco 49ers players